The U.S. Economic Development Administration (EDA) is an agency in the United States Department of Commerce that provides grants and technical assistance to economically distressed communities in order to generate new employment, help retain existing jobs and stimulate industrial and commercial growth through a variety of investment programs.

History
In 1965, Congress passed the Public Works and Economic Development Act of 1965 (PWEDA) (42 U.S.C. § 3121), which authorized the creation of the Economic Development Administration (EDA) to generate jobs, help retain existing jobs, and stimulate industrial and commercial growth in economically troubled areas of the United States. EDA assistance is available to rural and urban areas of the United States experiencing high unemployment, low income, or other severe economic distress.

Mission and investment priorities
The EDA's stated mission is to "lead the federal economic development agenda by promoting innovation and competitiveness, preparing American regions for growth and success in the worldwide economy."

The EDA's investment policy is designed to establish a foundation for sustainable job growth and the building of durable regional economies throughout the United States. This foundation builds upon two key economic drivers - innovation and regional collaboration. Innovation is the key to global competitiveness, new and better jobs, a resilient economy, and the attainment of national economic goals. Regional collaboration is essential for economic recovery because regions are the centers of competition in the new global economy and those that work together to leverage resources and use strengths to overcome weaknesses will fare better than those that do not. EDA encourages its partners around the country to develop initiatives that advance new ideas and creative approaches to address rapidly evolving economic conditions.

Role
The EDA is the only federal government agency solely focused on economic development. EDA works with communities across the country on regional economic development strategies to attract private investment and create jobs in economically distressed areas of the United States.

EDA's economic footprint is wide and its tool box is extensive—including technical assistance, post-disaster recovery assistance, trade adjustment support, strategic planning and research and evaluation capacity, thereby allowing the agency to offer the most effective investment to help communities succeed in the global economy.

Multi-agency initiatives
EDA leads a host of multi-agency initiatives to advance intergovernmental and public-private partnerships across the nation. These initiatives include:
Assistance to Coal Communities
EDA Vista Corps
Americas Competitiveness Exchange

Organization
The EDA is led by an Assistant Secretary of Commerce for Economic Development, who is appointed by the President of the United States. The Assistant Secretary is assisted in running the Administration by two Deputy Assistant Secretaries and various other senior career federal employees, and has the following organizational structure:

Assistant Secretary of Commerce for Economic Development
Deputy Assistant Secretary of Commerce for Economic Development/Chief Operating Officer
Deputy Assistant Secretary of Commerce for Economic Development/Office of Regional Affairs
Office of External Affairs
Office of Information Technology
Office of Innovation and Entrepreneurship
Office of Finance and Management Services
Deputy Assistant Secretary of Commerce for Regional Affairs
Office of Regional Affairs
Atlanta Regional Office
Austin Regional Office
Chicago Regional Office
Denver Regional Office
Philadelphia Regional Office
Seattle Regional Office

Senior leadership
Alejandra Y. Castillo, Assistant Secretary of Commerce for Economic Development
Dennis Alvord, Deputy Assistant Secretary of Commerce for Economic Development and COO
Craig Buerstatte, Deputy Assistant Secretary for Regional Affairs  
Michele Chang, Deputy Assistant Secretary of Policy
Molly Ritner, Chief of Staff
Greg Brown, Chief Financial Officer & Chief Administrative Officer
(Vacant), Director of the Office of External Affairs
Jeff Roberson, Chief Counsel
Bryan Borlik, Director of Performance and National Programs, Trade Adjustment Assistance
Angela Ewell-Madison, Director of the Office of Legislative and Intergovernmental Affairs
(Vacant), Director of the Office of Public Affairs
Doug Lynott, Director of Economic Development Integration and Disaster Recovery

See also
 Title 13 of the Code of Federal Regulations
 Federal Trade Commission
 United States Commercial Service
 United States Chamber of Commerce
 Small Business Administration

References

External links
 
 Economic Development Administration in the Federal Register

Investment promotion agencies
United States Department of Commerce agencies
United States economic policy
Government agencies established in 1965
Development in North America
Federal assistance in the United States